Alban Erskine MacLellan (February 9, 1902 – December 20, 1968) was a railway foreman and a provincial politician from Alberta, Canada. He served as a member of the Legislative Assembly of Alberta from 1935 to 1940 sitting with the Social Credit caucus in government.

Political career
MacLellan ran for a seat to the Alberta Legislature as a Social Credit candidate in the electoral district of Innisfail for the 1935 Alberta general election. He won a strong first ballot majority defeating three other candidates to pick up the seat for his party.

The 1940 boundary redistribution saw the Innisfail electoral district get abolished, along with other districts whose representatives had gone against the Social Credit party line. MacLellan ran for nomination as an Independent Progressive candidate and was nominated at a convention on July 19, 1939. He stood for a second term in the 1940 Alberta general election in the Red Deer provincial electoral district and was defeated finishing in last place on the first vote count and getting eliminated. He lost to former member of Parliament and Independent candidate Alfred Speakman.

MacLellan made an attempt to run for a seat to the House of Commons of Canada in the federal electoral district of Red Deer in the 1945 Canadian federal election as a Co-operative Commonwealth candidate. He was defeated by incumbent Frederick Shaw finishing in third place in the field of five candidates.

References

External links
Legislative Assembly of Alberta Members Listing

Alberta Social Credit Party MLAs
Independent Alberta MLAs
People from Prince County, Prince Edward Island
1902 births
1968 deaths
Co-operative Commonwealth Federation candidates for the Canadian House of Commons